Sergio Valentín Ortega Leguias (born 18 April 1990) is a Panamanian footballer who plays primarily as a left back. He plays his club football for Plaza Amador and made his national team debut in 2017.

International career
Ortega received his first call up for the Panama national football team in October 2007 for a friendly against Grenada, initially believing the call up was part of a practical joke by his brother. He made his international debut as a substitute in place of Richard Peralta during a 5–0 victory for Panama.

References

External links

Panamanian footballers
Panama international footballers
1990 births
Living people
C.D. Plaza Amador players
Association football fullbacks